Asfanakhia, is an Arab dish of cut meat with spinach and chickpeas.

History 
It was mentioned in “Al-Tabikh” in 1225 by Muhammad ibn al-Hasan al-Baghdadi:
"It is made by taking a fatty cut of meat and cut into medium pieces. The rump is then taken, cut lengthwise and the fat separated from the meat. The meat is added to the fat in a pot and mixed. Then, fill the pot with water and add salt at the boil. Then boil and remove the fatty foam and add soaked and peeled chick peas. Fresh spinach is washed with water, then chop the leafy bit and discard the stalk. Beat the spinach in a stone mortar and add to the pot. When it's ready, add landmint, cumin, crushed pepper, mastic and finely crushed garlic. Then increase the pot water as needed and simmer. After an hour add washed rice as much as needed. Then leave it on low heat for another hour and serve.

See also
 Arab cuisine

References

Arab cuisine